The Zimbabwe cricket team toured South Africa in September and October 2018 to play three One Day Internationals (ODIs) and three Twenty20 International (T20I) matches. The ODI fixtures were part of South Africa's preparations for the 2019 Cricket World Cup.

Dale Steyn, who last played an ODI in October 2016, was named in South Africa's ODI squad following a lengthy injury-enforced break. Steyn was selected to play in the second ODI of the series.

Before the start of the tour, both Faf du Plessis and Hashim Amla were initially ruled out of South Africa's squads due to injury. JP Duminy was named captain in place of du Plessis, with Dean Elgar added to the ODI squad, replacing Amla. In the first ODI, Duminy captained South Africa for the first time in ODIs. However, ahead of the third ODI match, du Plessis was declared fit to play quicker than expected, and returned to the side.

In the second ODI of the tour, Hamilton Masakadza became the fourth cricketer for Zimbabwe to play in 200 ODI matches. South Africa won the ODI series 3–0. South Africa won the T20I series 2–0 after the final match was washed out with no play possible.

Squads

Prior to the start of the tour, Keshav Maharaj was released from South Africa's squad. Ahead of the second ODI match, Wiaan Mulder suffered an injury and was ruled out of South Africa's squad for the rest of the series. Following the first T20I match, Imran Tahir was released from South Africa's squad, to allow the team to try out other bowling options.

ODI Series

1st ODI

2nd ODI

3rd ODI

T20I series

1st T20I

2nd T20I

3rd T20I

Notes

References

External links
 Series home at ESPN Cricinfo

2018 in South African cricket
2018 in Zimbabwean cricket
International cricket competitions in 2018–19
2018–19